Sheguiandah First Nation is an Anishinaabe First Nation on Manitoulin Island in Ontario, Canada. Its land base is located on the Sheguiandah 24 reserve.

References

Anishinaabe reserves in Ontario
Ojibwe governments
Communities in Manitoulin Island